Acyphoderes is a genus of beetles in the family Cerambycidae, containing the following species:

 Acyphoderes abdominalis (Olivier, 1795)
 Acyphoderes acutipennis Thomson, 1860
 Acyphoderes amoena Chemsak & Linsley, 1979
 Acyphoderes auricapilla Fisher, 1947
 Acyphoderes aurulenta (Kirby, 1818)
 Acyphoderes ayalai Chemsak & Linsley, 1988
 Acyphoderes bayanicus Giesbert, 1991
 Acyphoderes carinicollis Bates, 1873
 Acyphoderes cracentis Chemsak & Noguera, 1997
 Acyphoderes cribricollis Bates, 1892
 Acyphoderes crinita (Klug, 1825)
 Acyphoderes dehiscens Chemsak, 1997
 Acyphoderes delicata Horn, 1894
 Acyphoderes fulgida Chemsak & Linsley, 1979
 Acyphoderes hirtipes (Klug, 1825)
 Acyphoderes itaiuba Martins & Galileo, 2004
 Acyphoderes longicollis Chemsak & Noguera, 1993
 Acyphoderes magna Giesbert, 1991
 Acyphoderes odyneroides White, 1855
 Acyphoderes parva Chemsak & Linsley, 1979
 Acyphoderes prolixa Chemsak & Linsley, 1979
 Acyphoderes rubrohirsutotibialis Tippmann, 1953
 Acyphoderes sexualis Linsley, 1934
 Acyphoderes suavis Bates, 1885
 Acyphoderes synoecae Chemsak & Noguera, 1997
 Acyphoderes velutina Bates, 1885
 Acyphoderes yucateca (Bates, 1892)

References

 
Rhinotragini